James Jakes (born 4 August 1987 in Leeds, West Yorkshire) is a British racing driver.

Career

T-Cars 
Jakes started his racing career in 2002 competing in 5 rounds of the T-Car Championship. In 2003 James continued in T-cars, finishing 2nd in the championship.

Formula Renault 
For the 2004 season, Jakes moved into the British Formula Renault Championship with Team AKA. Jakes progressed his skills as a racing driver to the point where he was regularly contending for race wins, helping him to attain 3rd in the championship in 2005. His two seasons in Formula Renault also helped him to attain a McLaren Autosport BRDC Award Nomination and also receive BRDC Rising Star status.

Formula Three 
Jakes did one round of the 2005 British Formula 3 Championship in the National Class. In 2006 James made the move to the British Formula 3 Championship full-time with Hitech Racing where he finished 8th and also finished 6th in the Macau Grand Prix.

For 2007 James moved on to the Formula Three Euroseries with Manor Motorsport. He finished fifth in the championship, with one win coming at Magny-Cours. Staying in the championship for the 2008 season, Jakes changed teams to be one of the four drivers at the highly successful ART Grand Prix team. He joined fellow Brit Jon Lancaster in the team, with his other team-mates being Frenchman Jules Bianchi, and German Nico Hülkenberg. He did lie in fifth place at one point in the season, having won on the street circuit at Pau but tailed off to be thirteenth in the championship.

GP2 Series 
He drove in the 2008–09 GP2 Asia Series season for the Super Nova Racing team. He did not race in any category during the summer of 2009, but rejoined Super Nova for the 2009–10 GP2 Asia Series season. He equalled his best finish of third during the first race in Abu Dhabi, but was replaced by the team's 2010 main series driver Marcus Ericsson for the second round. Following the conclusion of the GP3 season, he made his GP2 Series début at the final round of the 2010 season, replacing Álvaro Parente at Scuderia Coloni.

GP3 Series
Jakes signed to drive for Manor Motorsport in the inaugural GP3 Series season for 2010. Despite missing two rounds of the championship, he scored three podium finishes to take eighth position in the drivers' championship.

IndyCar Series

Jakes had signed with Coloni to race in the GP2 Asia Series in 2011, but in March tested an IndyCar Series car for Dale Coyne Racing at Barber Motorsports Park. It was subsequently announced that Jakes would be replaced in Coloni's GP2 car by Luca Filippi and that Jakes would race for Coyne in the 2011 IndyCar Series season. In his debut season he collected no top 10s and resulted 22nd in the final standings. In 2012, Jakes resulted 10th at Texas Motor Speedway and 8th at the Indy Toronto, repeating his 22nd place in the season standings.

Jakes switched to Rahal Letterman Lanigan Racing for the 2013 season. At Detroit he finished 10th in the first race and second in the second race. Later he finished sixth in Houston 1. The Brit ended 19th in the final standings.

After a sabbatical year, Jakes joined Schmidt Peterson Motorsports for the 2015 IndyCar season. He collected a third place in New Orleans.

Racing record

Complete Formula 3 Euro Series results
(key) (Races in bold indicate pole position) (Races in italics indicate fastest lap)

Complete GP2 Series results
(key) (Races in bold indicate pole position) (Races in italics indicate fastest lap)

Complete GP2 Asia Series results
(key) (Races in bold indicate pole position) (Races in italics indicate fastest lap)

Complete GP3 Series results
(key) (Races in bold indicate pole position) (Races in italics indicate fastest lap)

IndyCar Series
(key)

 1 The Las Vegas Indy 300 was abandoned after Dan Wheldon died from injuries sustained in a 15-car crash on lap 11.
* Season still in progress.

 * Podium (Non-win) indicates 2nd or 3rd place finishes.
 ** Top 10s (Non-podium) indicates 4th through 10th place finishes.

Indianapolis 500

Complete FIA World Endurance Championship results

References

External links 
 
www.supernova-racing.com – GP2 Racing Team Official Website
IndyCar Driver Page
www.art-grandprix.com
www.manor-motorsport.com
www.akacobra.com – Formerly Team AKA

1987 births
Living people
Sportspeople from Leeds
English racing drivers
Racing drivers from Yorkshire
North American Formula Renault drivers
Brazilian Formula Renault 2.0 drivers
Dutch Formula Renault 2.0 drivers
British Formula Renault 2.0 drivers
Formula Renault Eurocup drivers
Formula 3 Euro Series drivers
British Formula Three Championship drivers
Formula Palmer Audi drivers
GP2 Asia Series drivers
GP3 Series drivers
GP2 Series drivers
IndyCar Series drivers
Indianapolis 500 drivers
Manor Motorsport drivers
ART Grand Prix drivers
Dale Coyne Racing drivers
Rahal Letterman Lanigan Racing drivers
Arrow McLaren SP drivers
Hitech Grand Prix drivers
Scuderia Coloni drivers
CRS Racing drivers
Performance Racing drivers
Super Nova Racing drivers
24H Series drivers